Stored Images is the second album by Belgian electro-industrial act Suicide Commando.

Track listing

References 
Stored Images on Discogs

Suicide Commando albums
1995 albums